Lake Carey is a salt lake located in the Goldfields-Esperance region of Western Australia. It was named in 1869 by surveyor John Forrest in company with Tommy Windich, after Thomas Campbell Carey, the government surveyor to whom Forrest had been apprenticed in 1863.

Lake Carey is one of a chain of lakes that makes up the Carey Palaeodrainage system, formed during the Tertiary Period, from about 65 million years ago.

Mining activity and its discharge has affected the lake.

The Wangkathaa people are associated with the land around Lake Carey.

See also

 List of lakes of Western Australia

References

External links

 A gold prospectors description of Lake Carey
 MSN map of Lake Carey

Carey
Carey, Lake